The National Theatre (1836-1863) was a theatre in the West End of Boston, Massachusetts, in the mid-19th century. William Pelby established the enterprise in 1836, and presented productions of "original pieces, and the efforts of a well selected stock company, which, with few exceptions, have been American. The scenery is of the highest order, and the business of the stage well directed. Mr C.A. Eaton made his debut at this theatre, and here Mr. F.S. Hill's early labors were eminently successful. Mr. J.S. Jones has written and produced on this stage thirty pieces, embracing every department except tragedy." William Washburn designed the building, erected on the site of the former Warren Theatre. Performers at the National included Edwin Adams, Marietta Zanfretta, Jean Margaret Davenport, Julia Dean, Jonathan Harrington, W.H. Smith, Mary Ann Vincent, and Billy Whitlock. In 1852 the theatre burnt down, and was rebuilt. In 1863 the building was again destroyed by fire.

Architecture
The structure is covered on the exterior walls with cement, in imitation' of granite, which gives a uniform and beautiful appearance. The interior comprises a pit, with 600 seats, three tiers of boxes, with 336 seats each, and a gallery with 200 seats. The saloons, lobbies, refreshment rooms, &c. are spacious, convenient and well ventilated by large windows on the two streets and in rear. The boxes have five rows of seats each, and are accessible from both streets, affording, in case of fire or other cause of alarm, ready egress from the house. The remaining boxes are supported by 2 octagonal pillars of the same material, 9 inches in diameter. The main ceiling is a single arch, of  span, rising within  of the ridge. The gallery is entirely above the level cornice of the building, having an arched ceiling which rises five feet higher than the main ceiling, and is ventilated by a large round window placed in the centre of the tympanum. It is composed of pilasters, having ornamented capitals and bases, which support a beautifully enriched arch, crowned with the American eagle. The circle of boxes is so arranged, that in every part of the house a full view is had of the stage. The decorations are in good taste. The lower tier of boxes is adorned with paintings of the battles of the United States Navy; the second tier bears the arms of the States, and the upper parts have appropriate scenes from the Iliads."

Performances

Images

Managers/Proprietors
Managers and proprietors included: William Pelby (1836-1850), William B. English (ca.1857-1863), Thomas Barry, Rosalie Pelby, John B. Wright, Henry W. Fenno, George Bird, Joseph Leonard, W.M. Fleming, Joseph Cushing, G.H. Griffiths, James Pilgrim, Henry Willard, Charles R. Thome, Sr., John Moran, Walter Gay, Henry Willard, F.B. Conway, E.B. Williams, Thomas Hampton, J. C. Myers, C.J. Boniface.

Variant names
 Willard's National Theatre, 1856
 People's National Theatre, 1856, 1859
 Union Concert Hall, 1862

References

Commercial buildings completed in 1836
Commercial buildings completed in 1852
Former theatres in Boston
Former buildings and structures in Boston
1836 establishments in Massachusetts
1863 disestablishments
Cultural history of Boston
19th century in Boston
West End, Boston
Event venues established in 1836